Tabebuia heterophylla is a species of tree native to the Caribbean, and is also cultivated. It is also known as Roble blanco, pink manjack, pink trumpet tree, white cedar, and whitewood.

Description

Tabebuia heterophylla grows up to 20 to 30 feet tall. Leaves are opposite and palmately compound with five or fewer leaflets. T. heterophylla is considered brevi decidius. Flowers are Showy pink, tubular and five lobed (2 to 3 inches long). The flowering time is spring and Summer. Fruit is a seedpod, it splits along 2 lines to shed the numerous thin light brown seeds (1/2 to 1 inch long with 2 white wings).

Wood
This tree is valuable for its timber production and grown for such purposes on plantations. It is commonly harvested from the wild for use locally and for export.Pink manjack is used as a street tree. Its height allows for it to provide lasting shade and as a result it can provide shade for a residential property near the patio or deck. Its floral display allow it to be valued and as a result, it is known as an ornamental tree.

Flower anatomy

The flowers of Tabebuia heterophylla are in an inflorescence of the umbellate type. It is a perfect and complete flower with radial (actinomorphic) symmetry, and the whorls of the corrolla and the calyx are connately joined. The ovary is superior with an axile placentation, two locules and two carpels.

References

heterophylla
Ornamental trees
Trees of the Caribbean